Fiona Reid, CM (born 24 July 1951) is an English-born Canadian television, film, and stage actress. She is best known for her roles as Cathy on the TV series King of Kensington and Harriet Miller in the film My Big Fat Greek Wedding.

Early life
Reid was born in Whitstable, Kent, England. Her father was a doctor in the British Army. She lived in Germany, Africa, and the United States before settling in Canada with her family in 1964.

She studied acting at McGill University, receiving a Bachelor of Arts degree in 1972, and at the Banff Centre for the Arts.

Career

Fiona Reid is one of Canada's best known stage actors, having performed in theatres across the country, including five seasons with the  Stratford Festival and twelve seasons at the  Shaw Festival, as well as theatres in Great Britain and the U.S.. Over her career her performances have garnered her two Dora Mavor Moore awards, a Jessie Award (Vancouver) and a Sterling Award (Edmonton). In 2015, Fiona received the Toronto Critics’ Award for her performance of Sonia in Vanya, Sonia, Masha and Spike (Mirvish Productions).

Her career has been marked by diverse signature roles that include Rose in The Children, Amanda (The Glass Menagerie), Julie (London Road), Blanche Dubois (A Streetcar Named Desire), Lady Bracknell (The Importance of Being Earnest), Martha (Who's Afraid of Virginia Woolf), Mrs Lovett (Sweeney Todd), Hedda Gabler and Clare (A Delicate Balance), amongst many others. Her film credits include My Big Fat Greek Wedding, One Week and The Time Traveler's Wife.

In 2016, Reid starred as Queen Elizabeth II in the Mirvish Productions presentation of The Audience at the Royal Alexandra Theatre in Toronto.

In 2019 Fiona began her run in Harry Potter and the Cursed Child on Broadway.

Awards
She has twice won the Dora Mavor Moore Award, in 1993 for Fallen Angels and in 1995 for Six Degrees of Separation. She won an Elizabeth Sterling Haynes Award (Sterling Award) for her performance in August: Osage County.

In 2006, she was made a Member of the Order of Canada She received The Barbara Hamilton Award in 2008. and an award of excellence from ACTRA Toronto in 2010.

Fiona has received an honorary doctorate from Bishop's University and is a graduate of McGill University. She is past president of the Actor's Fund of Canada (The AFC).

Personal life
Reid met McCowan Thomas  doing summer stock theatre and married him in 1977. They have two children, Alec and Julia.

Filmography

References

External links

Fiona Reid at Northern Stars

Canadian film actresses
Canadian television actresses
Canadian voice actresses
English film actresses
English television actresses
English voice actresses
English emigrants to Canada
Living people
McGill University alumni
Members of the Order of Canada
People from Whitstable
Dora Mavor Moore Award winners
Actresses from Kent
1951 births